The Rock of Tanios is a 1993 novel by the French-Lebanese writer Amin Maalouf. It received the Prix Goncourt.

See also
 1993 in literature
 Contemporary French literature

References

1993 novels
Novels by Amin Maalouf
Prix Goncourt winning works
Éditions Grasset books